Todd is an extinct town in Morgan County, in the U.S. state of Missouri.

A post office called Todd was established in 1885, and remained in operation until 1917. Jonathan Todd, an early postmaster, gave the community his last name.

References

Ghost towns in Missouri
Former populated places in Morgan County, Missouri